Sandy Posey (born Sandra Lou Posey, June 18, 1944) is an American popular singer who enjoyed success in the 1960s with singles such as her 1966 recording of Martha Sharp's compositions "Born a Woman" and "Single Girl". She is often described as a country singer, although, like Skeeter Davis (to whom she has been frequently compared), her output has varied. Later in her career, the term "countrypolitan", associated with the "Nashville sound", was sometimes applied. Posey had four hit singles in the United States, three of which peaked at number 12 on the Hot 100.

Session singer
Posey was born in Jasper, Alabama. She graduated from high school in West Memphis, Arkansas, in 1962. Posey obtained work as a session singer after she was recommended by an aunt to an acquaintance who worked in television.

In addition to working as a receptionist at a studio in Memphis, she took part in recording sessions across the Deep South, including sessions produced by Lincoln "Chips" Moman for Elvis Presley and on Percy Sledge’s "When a Man Loves a Woman" (a number one hit in the US in 1966). Other singers whom she backed included Joe Tex, Bobby Goldsboro and Tommy Roe.

Solo career
Posey's first single record, under the name Sandy Carmel, was "Kiss Me Goodnight" (1965), written by William Cates, which was coupled with "First Boy". This was released by Bell Records but received minimal publicity and made little impact. Assisted by Gary Walker, a music publisher who became her manager, Posey then made a demonstration recording of "Born a Woman", written by Martha Sharp. According to Posey, Chips Moman "went wild" when he heard this and helped her to obtain a contract with MGM in Nashville.

"Born a Woman"
Posey had her first hit with "Born a Woman", which Moman produced in Nashville on March 15, 1966.  This reached number 12 on the Hot 100 in August 1966. It sold over one million copies and was awarded a gold disc. "Born a Woman" is a song featuring prominent piano, understated strings and horns, and distinctive multitracked vocals. Posey received two Grammy Award nominations for "Born a Woman" in the categories of vocal performance (female) and contemporary (R&R) solo vocal.  "Born a Woman" was covered in Australia in 1966 by Judy Stone, and her version and Sandy Posey's version both reached the top 5 in that country. The song was later covered by Nick Lowe (Bowi EP) and Hubble Bubble. The song was later used by Rush Limbaugh for his “Feminist Update”.

"Single Girl"
Posey's next single release was "Single Girl", also written by Martha Sharp. Recorded in Nashville on August 19, 1966, this also reached number 12 in America in January 1967 and number 15 in Great Britain, where it benefited from airplay on pirate radio (peaking, for example, at number 7 in Radio London's non-sales-based Fab 40 on New Year's Day, 1967). It followed "Born a Woman" by selling in excess of one million copies. "Single Girl" was re-released in Britain in 1975 and reached the top 50 for a second time.

"What a Woman in Love Won't Do"
In November 1966, "What a Woman in Love Won't Do" hit No. 31 on the Hot 100, while in the UK singles chart it peaked at No. 48.

Other work
Posey's final pop top 20 hit was "I Take It Back", another US number 12 in July 1967, although she made other recordings for MGM Records until 1968, including "What a Woman in Love Won't Do", which peaked at number 31 in the US in late 1967. These were mostly produced by Moman, but a few, including a version of the Shirelles' hit "Will You Still Love Me Tomorrow" (1968), were produced by Joe South.

Country recordings
Posey turned to the country music field in 1971, signing with Columbia Records with Billy Sherrill as producer. Sherrill had just successfully turned another 1960s pop star, Jody Miller, into a leading country female vocalist, and it appeared Posey might be another one when the first single, "Bring Him Safely Home to Me" hit the top 20. However, it was not to be, with only two other singles barely scraping into the top 40. Posey signed with Monument Records in 1976 with just one single charting and later in the year moved to Warner Bros. Records. Her first single for the label inauspiciously peaked at No. 93, but in 1978 and 1979 she charted three top 30 country hits before this brief comeback faded away with the new decade.

Posey occasionally recorded as a solo artist into the early 1980s, but she reverted to occasional background session work and later briefly performed as a background vocalist for Skeeter Davis on an international tour. She made a number of country recordings with a religious theme after embracing Christianity in 1974.

In 1983, Posey had another charted single on the country charts, titled "Can't Get Used to Sleeping Without You". In 2004, Posey recorded an album for King Records in Nashville, Tennessee. She is now signed with Crossworlds Entertainment of Lebanon, Tennessee. During 2007, Posey released several songs through Crossworlds Entertainment that have been available for purchase online.

Personal life
In 1968, Posey married Wade Cummins, who performed as an impersonator of Elvis Presley under the name of Elvis Wade. Posey appeared with Presley during an engagement in Las Vegas in 1969.

Discography

Albums

Singles

Notes
A^ "Single Girl" was re-released in the UK in 1975 and peaked at No. 35.
B^ "She's Got You" peaked at No. 22 on the Canadian Adult Contemporary Tracks chart.

References

External links
[ Allmusic]
Countrypolitan
Sandy Posey: MGM home page (with extensive discography)

1944 births
Living people
People from Jasper, Alabama
American women country singers
American country singer-songwriters
American women pop singers
Columbia Records artists
MGM Records artists
Country musicians from Alabama
American Christians
Christians from Alabama
21st-century American women
Singer-songwriters from Alabama